Tarantism is a form of hysteric behaviour originating in Southern Italy, popularly believed to result from the bite of the wolf spider Lycosa tarantula (distinct from the broad class of spiders also called tarantulas).
A better candidate cause is Latrodectus tredecimguttatus, commonly known as the Mediterranean black widow or steppe spider, although no link between such bites and the behaviour of tarantism has ever been demonstrated. However, the term historically is used to refer to a dancing mania – characteristic of Southern Italy – which likely had little to do with spider bites. The tarantella dance supposedly evolved from a therapy for tarantism.

History
It was originally described in the 11th century. The condition was common in Southern Italy, especially in the province of Taranto, during the 16th and 17th centuries. There were strong suggestions that there is no organic cause for the heightened excitability and restlessness that gripped the victims. The stated belief of the time was that victims needed to engage in frenzied dancing to prevent death from tarantism. Supposedly a particular kind of dance, called the tarantella, evolved from this therapy. A prime location for such outbursts was the church at Galatina, particularly at the time of the Feast of Saints Peter and Paul on 29 June. "The dancing is placed under the sign of Saint Paul, whose chapel serves as a "theatre" for the tarantulees' public meetings. The spider seems constantly interchangeable with Saint Paul; the female tarantulees dress as "brides of Saint Paul". As a climax, "the tarantulees, after having danced for a long time, meet together in the chapel of Saint Paul and communally attain the paroxysm of their trance, ... the general and desperate agitation was dominated by the stylised cry of the tarantulees, the 'crisis cry', an ahiii uttered with various modulations".

Francesco Cancellieri, in his exhaustive treatise on Tarantism, takes note of semi-scientific, literary, and popular observations, both recent and ancient, giving each similar weight. He notes a report that in August 1693, a doctor in Naples had himself been bitten by two tarantulas, with six witnesses and a notary, but did not suffer the dancing illness. Cancellieri in part attributes this illness not only to the spiders but to the locale, since Tarantism was mainly seen in Basilicata, Apulia, Sicily, and Calabria. He states:

He goes on to describe some specific observations of the malady, typically afflicting peasants, alone or in groups. The malady typically affected peasants on hot summer days, causing indolence. Then he describes how only treatment through dancing music could restore them to vitality; for example:

Interpretation and controversy
John Crompton proposed that ancient Bacchanalian rites that had been suppressed by the Roman Senate in 186 BC went underground, reappearing under the guise of emergency therapy for bite victims.

The phenomenon of tarantism is consistent with mass psychogenic illness.

Although the popular belief persists that tarantism results from a spider bite, it remains scientifically unsubstantiated. Donaldson, Cavanagh, and Rankin (1997) conclude that the actual cause or causes of tarantism remain unknown.

Cultural references
Many historical and cultural references are associated with this disease and the ensuing "cure" – the tarantella. It is, for example, a key image in Henrik Ibsen's A Doll's House and the spell "Tarantallegra" from the Harry Potter series. It was also mentioned in the novel 39 Clues: Superspecial Outbreak.
The mention of the spider "tarantula" and description of its venom and the associated addiction has been depicted in the Indian television show "Byomkesh Bakshi" in episode 4 titled "Makdi ka Ras/makorshar rawsh".

See also
Dancing mania
Ergotism
Spider bite

References
Notes

Sources
 Anon (1968). Tarantism: St. Paul and the Spider, in Essays and Reviews form the Times Literary Supplement. London: Oxford University Press, pp. 172–183. Originally published in the Times Literary Supplement, 27 April 1967.
 Cancellieri, Francesco (1817). Letters of Francesco Cancellieri to the ch. Signore Dottore Koreff, Professor of Medicine of the University of Berlin, about Tarantism, the airs of Roma, and of its countryside, and the Papal palaces inside, and outside, Rome: with the description of the Pontifical Castel Gandolfo, and surrounding countryside. (in Italian). Rome: Presso Francesco Bourlie.
 Crompton, John (1954). The Life of the Spider. Mentor Books. 
 
 Hanna, Judith Lynne (2006) . Dancing for Health. Rowman Altamira. , . 
 Rouget, Gilbert (1985) Music and Trance : a Theory of the Relations between Music and Possession. University of Chicago Press. 
 

Ailments of unknown cause
Mass psychogenic illness
Spiders and humans
Toxicology